Yichang Sanxia Airport  is an airport serving the city of Yichang, Hubei Province, China. It has four gates.

Airlines and destinations

Passenger

See also
List of airports in the People's Republic of China

References

Airports in Hubei
Yichang